Rob'n'Raz featuring Leila K is the 1990 debut studio album by Swedish dance music duo Rob'n'Raz, featuring Swedish singer and rapper Leila K on vocals. It includes the single "Got to Get", which reached the top 10 of most European charts and number 49 on the US Billboard Hot 100, and "Rok the Nation", which was a modest hit in Europe.

Track listing
All tracks written by Rob'n'Raz, except where noted.
"Acozawea"
"Got to Get" (Rob'n'Raz, MC II Fresh, Leila K)
"On Tour"
"Just Tell Me" (Rob'n'Raz, Leila K)	
"Human Drummer"
"It Feels So Right" (Rob'n'Raz, Leila K)
"From Scratch"
"Rok the Nation" (Rob'n'Raz, MC II Fresh, Leila K)
"Do Something Nice"
"Love 4 Love" (Rob'n'Raz, Seisay)
"Fonky Beats for Your Mind"
"Dance the Fonk"
"Mind Expander"
"Rok the Nation" (Funk-E Drummer Mix)
"Got to Get" (Stones Nordik Swing Theory)

Charts

External links
Rob'n'Raz featuring Leila K at Discogs

References

1990 debut albums
Leila K albums
Rob'n'Raz albums
Arista Records albums